Andreas Lukse (born 8 November 1987) is an Austrian professional footballer who plays for First Vienna.

Club career
On 5 July 2019, Lukse signed for 1. FC Nürnberg on a free transfer from SC Rheindorf Altach.

International career
Lukse got his first call up to the senior Austria squad for a friendly against Switzerland in November 2015.

References

External links
 
 rapidarchiv.at profile 

1987 births
Living people
Austrian footballers
Austrian expatriate footballers
Association football goalkeepers
SK Rapid Wien players
DSV Leoben players
First Vienna FC players
FC Lustenau players
Kapfenberger SV players
SC Rheindorf Altach players
1. FC Nürnberg players
Austrian Football Bundesliga players
2. Liga (Austria) players
Austrian Regionalliga players
2. Bundesliga players
Austria international footballers
Austria youth international footballers
Austria under-21 international footballers
Austrian expatriate sportspeople in Germany
Expatriate footballers in Germany